

History
The MASCAC was founded in 1971 but did not begin sponsoring men's ice hockey as a sport until 2009. That season the five full member schools formed the ice hockey division along with two schools from the Little East and began a conference schedule. The MASCAC also started a conference tournament in its inaugural year however, despite having the requisite number of teams, it did not receive an automatic bid for the NCAA Tournament until 2012. The 2021 tournament was cancelled due to the COVID-19 pandemic.

2010

Note: * denotes overtime period(s)

2011

Note: * denotes overtime period(s)

2012

Note: * denotes overtime period(s)

2013

Note: * denotes overtime period(s)

2014

Note: * denotes overtime period(s)

2015

Note: * denotes overtime period(s)

2016

Note: * denotes overtime period(s)

2017

Note: * denotes overtime period(s)

2018

Note: * denotes overtime period(s)

2019

Note: * denotes overtime period(s)

2020

Note: * denotes overtime period(s)

2022

Note: * denotes overtime period(s)

2023

Note: * denotes overtime period(s)
† Game at Fitchburg postponed from Feb. 23
‡ Game at Worcester postponed from Feb. 28

Championships

See also
 ECAC Northeast Tournament

References

Ice hockey
Massachusetts State Collegiate Athletic Conference
Recurring sporting events established in 2010